The 1998–1999 Alabama Crimson Tide men's basketball team (variously "Alabama", "UA", "Bama" or "The Tide") represented the University of Alabama in the 1998–99 college basketball season. The head coach was Mark Gottfried, who was in his first season at Alabama. The team played its home games at Coleman Coliseum in Tuscaloosa, Alabama and was a member of the Southeastern Conference. This was the 87th season of basketball in the school's history. The Crimson Tide finished the season 17–15, 6–10 in SEC play, they lost in the second round of the 1999 SEC men's basketball tournament. They were invited to the 1999 National Invitation Tournament and lost in the first round.

Schedule and results

|-
!colspan=12 style=|Exhibition

|-
!colspan=12 style=|Non-conference regular season

|-
!colspan=12 style=|SEC regular season

|-
!colspan=12 style=| SEC tournament

|-
!colspan=12 style="background:#990000; color:#FFFFFF;"| National Invitation tournament

See also
1998–99 NCAA Division I men's basketball season
1998–99 NCAA Division I men's basketball rankings
1999 National Invitation Tournament

References

Alabama
Alabama Crimson Tide men's basketball seasons
1998 in sports in Alabama
Alabama Crimson Tide